Dag Terje Andersen (born 27 May 1957 in Frogn, Akershus) is a Norwegian politician for the Norwegian Labour Party. In addition to professional politics he has worked at a steel mill and as a lumberjack, something that has given him a reputation for politically representing the average citizen.

He was elected into the Norwegian parliament (Storting) as a representative from Vestfold in 1997, and he was re-elected in the 2005,  2009 and 2013 elections.

Andersen was the Mayor of Lardal from 1987 to 1992. He was at first a political advisor at the Ministry of Foreign Affairs before he became State Secretary at the Ministry of Social Affairs in 1992. He was a party secretary for the Norwegian Labour Party from 1992 until 1996.

In 1996 he became Minister of Agriculture, remaining in that post for slightly less than a year. Andersen later became Minister of Trade and Industry on 29 September 2006, when Odd Eriksen resigned.

From 2009 to 2013, Andersen served as President of the Storting.

External links

1957 births
Living people
People from Frogn
Labour Party (Norway) politicians
Ministers of Agriculture and Food of Norway
Presidents of the Storting
Members of the Storting
21st-century Norwegian politicians
20th-century Norwegian politicians
Ministers of Trade and Shipping of Norway